Nick and Jane is a 1997 American romantic comedy film directed by Richard Mauro and starring Dana Wheeler-Nicholson, James McCaffrey, David Johansen, Miss Coco Peru and Gedde Watanabe.

Cast
Dana Wheeler-Nicholson as Jane
James McCaffrey as Nick
John Dossett as John
LisaGay Hamilton as Vickie
David Johansen as Carter
Gedde Watanabe as Enzo
Miss Coco Peru as Miss Coco
Dianne Brill as Celine
Saundra Santiago as Stephanie
George Coe as Mr. Morgan
Siobhan Fallon Hogan as Julie

Reception
Roger Ebert awarded the film one and a half stars.

References

External links
 
 

American romantic comedy films
1990s English-language films
1990s American films